Chris Hatcher (born February 18, 1973) is an American football coach and former player.  He is the head football coach at Samford University, a position he has held since 2014.  Hatcher served as the head football coach at Valdosta State University from 2000 to 2006, Georgia Southern University from 2007 to 2009, and Murray State University from 2010 to 2014.  His Valdosta State Blazers won the NCAA Division II Football Championship in 2004.  Hatcher played college football as a quarterback at Valdosta State from 1991 to 1994.

Playing career
A two-time All-American quarterback at Valdosta State University, Hatcher threw for 11,363 yards and 121 touchdowns during his stellar career. During his senior year in 1994, he led the Blazers to their first-ever postseason berth, advancing to the quarterfinals. When his career was completed, Hatcher set 29 VSU passing and total offense records. Among the national records he once set were a 68.5 career completion percentage and streak of 20 straight completions in a game against New Haven.

Hatcher was also successful in the classroom. Twice he received the Gulf South Conference’s Commissioner’s Trophy (which is awarded to the league’s Most Outstanding Student-Athlete). He finished his senior year by winning several national honors including: the NCAA Top Eight Award, the CoSIDA Academic All-America National Player of the Year and a postgraduate scholarship from the National Football Foundation and College Football Hall of Fame. In 1994, he won the Harlon Hill Trophy, awarded to the NCAA Division II National Player of the Year. Hatcher graduated from Valdosta State in 1995.

Coaching career

Valdosta State
The winningest coach in Blazers' history, Hatcher was 76–12 at his alma mater. When Hatcher took over as head coach in 2000, he wasted no time molding the Valdosta State program into the "Hatch Attack". In his first year back at VSU, Hatcher took a 4–7 squad the previous year and turned it around to a 10–2 record (8–1 in GSC action) and berth in the Division II playoffs. Hatcher’s coaching staff at Valdosta State in 2000 included future SEC head coaches Will Muschamp and Kirby Smart.

His 2001 and 2002 teams posted back-to-back undefeated records during the regular season, part of a Gulf South Conference record 35 straight victories during the regular season.

During the 2004 championship season, the Blazers lost their season-opener before rattling off 14 consecutive victories, capped by a 36–31 victory over Pittsburg State in the title game. Hatcher was named "National Coach of the Year" by the American Football Coaches Association and was the offensive coordinator for the East squad at the Hula Bowl.

In 2005, Valdosta opened the season ranked No. 1 for four straight weeks and saw the season culminate with a sixth-straight NCAA postseason appearance. Despite an 8–2 record in 2006, the 10th-ranked Blazers did not receive an invitation to the playoffs, marking the first time that occurred in the Hatcher era.

2006's team finished sixth nationally in passing offense (283 yards per game), 12th in scoring offense (34.9 ppg) and 19th in total offense (389.9 yards). However, Hatcher’s teams have been successful in all three facets. The 2006 defense ranked 27th nationally in scoring defense (15.7 points allowed) while the special teams ranked third in punt returns (17.3 yards) and blocked seven kicks.

Georgia Southern
Georgia Southern Director of Athletics Sam Baker announced the hiring of Hatcher as head football coach in January 2007.

"There were a lot of qualified candidates, but Chris Hatcher was someone I felt embodied all we were looking for," said Baker. "Chris has a proven track record as a head coach – capturing the national championship in 2004 and recording an .864 winning percentage during his seven-year tenure at Valdosta State. I looked for a coach who knows how to win and I believe Coach Hatcher can do that at the Division I level. I also wanted to hire a coach with strong recruiting ties in Georgia and Florida. Coach Hatcher knows the area well… Our Athletic Department’s charge was to go out and hire a head coach that will improve on the progress we made off the field, and have that translate to on-the-field success. I think we have that coach in Chris Hatcher."

On November 21, 2009, Georgia Southern Athletic Director, Sam Baker, announced the firing of Hatcher after the 2009 season.

Murray State
On December 21, 2009, Murray State University Athletic Director, Allen Ward, announced the hiring of Hatcher beginning the 2010 season.  In his first year at Murray State Hatcher led the Racers to a 5–3 record in the Ohio Valley Conference (tied for fourth place), and a 6–5 record overall.  2010 was the Racers first winning season since 2004. Went 7–4 in the 2011 season.

Samford
On December 10, 2014, it was announced that Hatcher would be the new head coach of the Samford Bulldogs. He replaces Pat Sullivan, Samford's all-time leader in wins, who resigned mainly due to health reasons. Former Samford coaches include Bobby Bowden (later head coach at West Virginia and Florida State), Wayne Grubb (who led Samford to the NCAA College Division West Region II Championship in 1971), and Terry Bowden (later head coach at Auburn, North Alabama and Akron).

Personal life
Hatcher and his wife, Lori, also a graduate of Valdosta State, are the parents of a son, Ty, and a daughter, Talley Ann.

Head coaching record

Awards and honors

2000
Gulf South Conference Coach of the Year
Schutt Sports National Coach of the Year
Atlanta Touchdown Club Coach of the Year

2001
AFCA Region 2 Coach of the Year
Gulf South Conference Coach of the Year
Atlanta Touchdown Club Coach of the Year

2002
AFCA Region 2 Coach of the Year
Gulf South Conference Coach of the Year
Schutt Sports National Coach of the Year
Atlanta Touchdown Club Coach of the Year

2004
AFCA National Coach of the Year
Johnny Vaught Coach of the Year
Macon Touchdown Club Coach of the Year
Atlanta Touchdown Club Coach of the Year
Offensive Coordinator for East squad at the Hula Bowl

References

External links
 Samford profile
 Murray State profile

1973 births
Living people
American football quarterbacks
Georgia Southern Eagles football coaches
Kentucky Wildcats football coaches
Murray State Racers football coaches
Valdosta State Blazers football players
Valdosta State Blazers football coaches
Samford Bulldogs football coaches
UCF Knights football coaches
Sportspeople from Macon, Georgia
Coaches of American football from Georgia (U.S. state)
Players of American football from Georgia (U.S. state)